WNXT can refer to:

 WNXT (AM), a radio station (1260 AM) licensed to Portsmouth, Ohio, United States
 WNXT-FM, a radio station (99.3 FM) licensed to Portsmouth, Ohio, United States